Costa Rica competed in the 2015 Pan American Games in Toronto, Ontario, Canada from July 10 to 26, 2015.

Track and field athlete Roberto Sawyers was named the flagbearer of the country at the opening ceremony.

Competitors
The following table lists Costa Rica's delegation per sport and gender.

Medalists
The following competitors from Costa Rica won medals at the games. In the by discipline sections below, medalists' names are bolded.

|style="text-align:left; width:78%; vertical-align:top;"|

|style="text-align:left; width:22%; vertical-align:top;"|

Archery

Costa Rica qualified one female archer based on its performance at the 2014 Pan American Championships.

Women

Athletics

Costa Rica qualified nine athletes (seven men and two women).

Men
Track

Field

Women
Track

Beach volleyball

Costa Rica qualified a women's pair for a total of two athletes.

Bowling

Boxing

Costa Rica qualified four male boxers.

Men

Canoeing

Slalom
Costa Rica qualified the following boats:

Cycling

Costa Rica qualified seven cyclists (one man and six women).

Mountain biking

Road
Women

Track
Team pursuit

Omnium

Equestrian

Costa Rica qualified a full dressage team of four athletes, however only 3 were selected to compete.

Dressage

Fencing

Costa Rica qualified 1 fencer (1 woman).

Football

Costa Rica's women's football team (of 18 athletes) qualified to compete at the games after winning the Central American qualifying tournament.

Women's tournament

Roster

Group B

Golf

Costa Rica qualified one male golfer.

Men

Gymnastics

Artistic
Costa Rica qualified one male gymnast.

Men
Individual Qualification

Qualification Legend: Q = Qualified to apparatus final

Judo

Costa Rica qualified one woman judoka.

Women

Modern pentathlon

Costa Rica qualified 1 male athlete.

Men

Racquetball

Costa Rica qualified a team of three men.

Roller sports

Costa Rica qualified two athletes (one male and one female) in the speed competitions. Originally the country had qualified two female athletes in the speed events, but ultimately it chose to only send one.

Speed

Shooting

Costa Rica received a wildcard to enter one male shooter.

Men

Swimming

Costa Rica qualified five swimmers (3 male and 2 female).

Men

Women

Synchronized swimming

Costa Rica qualified a duet of two athletes.

Taekwondo

Costa Rica qualified a team of one female athlete.

Tennis

Costa Rica qualified one athlete in the men's singles event.

Men

Triathlon

Costa Rica qualified two triathletes, one per gender.

Weightlifting

Costa Rica qualified a team of 2 athletes (1 man and 1 woman).

Wrestling

Costa Rica received one wildcard.

Men's freestyle

See also
Costa Rica at the 2016 Summer Olympics

References

Nations at the 2015 Pan American Games
P
2015